The Tower is the unofficial name for a large prominent peak that sits above Rummel Lake. It is located between Mount Engadine and Mount Galatea of the Kananaskis Range in Alberta, Canada.

Geology

The Tower is composed of sedimentary rock laid down during the Precambrian to Jurassic periods. Formed in shallow seas, this sedimentary rock was pushed east and over the top of younger rock during the Laramide orogeny.

Climate

Based on the Köppen climate classification, The Tower is located in a subarctic climate zone with cold, snowy winters, and mild summers.

References

Three-thousanders of Alberta
Alberta's Rockies